Abdul Samad bin Idris (23 October 1923 – 16 October 2003) was a former Malaysian politician. He served as Minister of Culture, Youth and Sports from 1976 to 1980.

Early life
Abdul Samad was born in Kampung Bukit Tempurung, Seri Menanti, Kuala Pilah, Negeri Sembilan on 23 October 1923. He began writing in 1945 when he was a newspaper reporter of Majlis and Utusan Melayu.

Death
Abdul Samad Idris died on 16 October 2003 at Kuala Lumpur Hospital due to stroke.

Election results

Honours
 :
 Member of the Order of the Defender of the Realm (AMN) (1958)
 :
 Companion of the Order of the Defender of the Realm (JMN) (1967)
 Commander of the Order of the Defender of the Realm (PMN) – Tan Sri (1981)
 :
  Knight Companion of the Order of Loyalty of Sultan Ismail of Johor (DSIJ) – Dato' (1979)
 Knight Commander of the Order of the Crown of Johor (DPMJ) – Dato' (1980)
 :
 Recipient of the Meritorious Service Medal (PJK)
Dato Setia Diwangsa (1967)
 Knight Grand Commander of the Order of Loyalty to Negeri Sembilan (SPNS) – Dato' Seri Utama (1985)

References 

1923 births
2003 deaths
Sports ministers
United Malays National Organisation politicians
Members of the Order of the Defender of the Realm
Companions of the Order of the Defender of the Realm
Commanders of the Order of the Defender of the Realm
Knights Commander of the Order of the Crown of Johor